A Turn in the South is a travelogue of the American South written by Nobel Prize-winning writer V. S. Naipaul.  The book was published in 1989 and is based upon the author's travels in the southern states of the United States.

Naipaul has written fiction and non-fiction about life in the Caribbean, India, Africa and South America.  The object of this book is to compare U.S. states such as South Carolina, Florida, Mississippi, et cetera to their geographical neighbors, the nations of the Caribbean.  He discusses topics such as Martin Luther King Jr., the economy, technology, industrialization, tourism, religion, rednecks and racism.

External links
Rednecks, Millionaires and Catfish Farms: A review of A Turn in the South, Published: February 5, 1989 The New York Times

Books by V. S. Naipaul
1989 non-fiction books
Books about the United States